Paulownia catalpifolia is a species of flowering plant in the family Paulowniaceae, native to Shandong province, China, and introduced to Hungary. An extremely fast-growing tree, it is cultivated in China for its timber.

References

Paulowniaceae
Trees of China
Endemic flora of China
Flora of Shandong
Plants described in 1997